This is a list of symphonies in C minor written by notable composers.

See also

For symphonies in C major, see List of symphonies in C major. For symphonies in other keys, see List of symphonies by key.

References

C minor
Symphonies